Angelos Tsavos (born 11 April 2002) is a Greek professional footballer who plays as a right-back for Super League club PAS Giannina.

Career
In summer 2022 he signed three years contract with PAS Giannina.

References

2002 births
Living people
Greek footballers
Super League Greece 2 players
Super League Greece players
Episkopi F.C. players
PAS Giannina F.C. players
Association football fullbacks